Semey International Airport , formerly New Semey and named after Abai Qunanbaiuly, is an airport in Semey, Kazakhstan, located  south-west of the city. It services large airliners. The airfield contains two groups of alert fighter pads. A  overrun exists at each end of runway 08/26.

Established in 1929, it is Kazakhstan's oldest international airport.

Declassified CIA documents indicate that in the late 1960s, during the height of the Sino-Soviet split, the Soviet Union used this airfield as a bomber staging base for Chinese targets, and at times the Tupolev Tu-22 Blinder was identified here.

The Tupolev Tu-128 and MiG-31 were also based here at various times.

Airlines and destinations

See also
Transport in Kazakhstan
List of the busiest airports in the former USSR

References

Soviet Air Force bases
Soviet Air Defence Force bases
Airports built in the Soviet Union
Airports in Kazakhstan
Kazakh Air Defense Forces